New York Community Bancorp, Inc. (NYCB) is a bank headquartered in Hicksville, New York with 225 branches in New York, New Jersey, Ohio, Florida and Arizona. NYCB is on the list of largest banks in the United States.

New York Community Bank is known for its avoidance of risky products, and focusing on income-producing assets to provide steady cash flows even in adverse credit cycles. A large majority of the loans originated by the bank are either multi-family or commercial loans, many in New York City, to buildings at full income-producing capacity and subject to laws regarding rent control in New York. As of 2015, New York Community Bank was the largest lender in the New York City metro area but differs from its larger national rivals by not even offering commercial real estate construction loans, finding them too risky.

In late December 2020, the bank announced a change in executive leadership. Longtime President, CEO and Board member Joseph Ficalora announced his retirement. Thomas Cangemi, the company's Chief Financial Officer since 2005, became president and CEO.

On April 26, 2021, New York Community Bank issued a press release indicating that they were acquiring Flagstar Bank in an all-stock merger.  On December 1, New York Community Bank formally acquired Flagstar Bank.

NYCB's focus on multi-family and commercial loans is evident by its $9.9 million average loan value across the $7.8 billion of loans that it originated in 2021.

Divisions
New York Community Bank operates branches under the following names:

 Community Bank (New York)
 Queens County Savings Bank (New York)
 Roslyn Savings Bank (New York)
 Richmond County Savings Bank (New York)
 Roosevelt Savings Bank (New York)
 Atlantic Bank (New York)
 Garden State Community Bank (New Jersey)
 AmTrust Bank (Florida and Arizona)
 Ohio Savings Bank (Ohio)
 Flagstar Bank (Michigan)

History
NYCB was founded on April 14, 1859, in Flushing, Queens, as Queens County Savings Bank, and changed its name on December 15, 2000, to New York Community Bank to better reflect its market area beyond Queens.

In 1993, the company became a public company via an initial public offering.

In 2000, the bank acquired Haven Bancorp for $196 million.

In 2001, NYCB acquired Richmond County Financial in an $802 million transaction.

In 2002, NYCB acquired asset manager Peter B. Cannell & Co.

In 2003, NYCB acquired Roslyn Bancorp in a $1.6 billion transaction.

In 2005, NYCB acquired Long Island Financial in a $70 million transaction.

In 2006, NYCB acquired Atlantic Bank of New York from the National Bank of Greece for $400 million.

In March 2007, NYCB acquired 11 branches in New York City from Doral Financial Corporation.

In April 2007, NYCB acquired Penn Federal Savings Bank for $262 million, adding branches in East Central and North East New Jersey.
 
In October 2007, NYCB acquired Synergy Bank of Cranford, New Jersey for $168 million in stock. In September 2009, NYCB re-branded the Synergy branches to Garden State Community Bank.

In December 2009, the Federal Deposit Insurance Corporation seized AmTrust, a bank headquartered in Cleveland, OH with 66 branches and $13 billion in assets in Ohio, Florida and Arizona. NYCB acquired Amtrust, which expanded NYCB's branch footprint outside of the New York metropolitan area for the first time. In 2017, the bank sold the mortgage business acquired from the purchase of AmTrust at a $90 million profit.

In March 2010, Desert Hills Bank of Phoenix, Arizona, with $496 million in assets, was seized by the FDIC and acquired by NYCB.

In June 2012, NYCB acquired the assets of Aurora Bank from Lehman Brothers.

On October 29, 2015, the bank announced an agreement to merge with Astoria Bank, but the proposed merger was terminated in December 2016 after failing to win regulatory approval.

On November 4, 2016, Brooklyn Sports & Entertainment announced that the bank had acquired the naming rights to Nassau Coliseum; it was renamed "NYCB Live: Home of the Nassau Veterans Memorial Coliseum", due to agreements requiring that "Nassau Veterans Memorial Coliseum" remain in the arena's name. NYCB pulled out of its naming rights contract in late August 2020 due to uncertainty surrounding the property after a June 2020 closure and subsequent new leaseholder.

On April 26, 2021, NYCB issued a press release indicating that it was acquiring Flagstar Bank in an all-stock merger. 

On March 19, 2023, NYCB acquired $38.4 billion of assets from the liquidated Signature Bank in a $2.7 billion deal, with 40 Signature branches being converted to Flagstar locations.

References

External links

1859 establishments in New York (state)
Banks based in New York (state)
Banks established in 1859
Companies based in Nassau County, New York
Companies listed on the New York Stock Exchange